Chicago Cab is a 1997 American drama film directed by Mary Cybulski and John Tintori. It is based on the play Hellcab by Will Kern.

Synopsis

The film follows an unnamed taxi driver (played by Paul Dillon) over one day in Chicago, shortly before Christmas. More than 30 passengers enter his taxi throughout the course of the film, providing brief looks into their personal lives. Among the actors giving cameo appearances are Gillian Anderson, John Cusack, Laurie Metcalf, Julianne Moore, John C. Reilly, Michael Shannon, Michael Ironside, and Reggie Hayes.

Release and reception

Chicago Cab had its premiere at the Chicago International Film Festival in October 1997, where it was nominated for a Golden Hugo Award. It was not released in movie theatres until September 18, 1998, when it played in two venues and earned $23,946.

The film received criticism for having unrealistic taxi passengers, since all of the characters have an exciting story. Roger Ebert, however, gave it three stars out of four, saying "Drama is always made of the emotional high points." Emanuel Levy also gave a positive review: "A compassionate portrait of a lonely cabbie is at the center of the serio comedy ... [the passengers] highlight perceptively the funny, scary and dreary moments in a typical working day of a city cab driver."

Chicago Cab was released on DVD on April 7, 2009.

Cast
 Paul Dillon as Cab Driver
 Michael Ironside as Al
 Laurie Metcalf as Female Ad Executive
 John C. Reilly as Steve
 Gillian Anderson as South Side Girl
 John Cusack as Scary Man
 Julianne Moore as Distraught Woman
 Moira Harris as Religious Mother
 Darryl Theirse as X-hat
 Shanésia Davis-Williams as Lawyer
 Matt Roth as Male Ad Executive
 Ron Dean as Old Snack Trucker
 April Grace as Shalita
 Harry Lennix as Pissed Off Boyfriend
 Kevin J. O'Connor as South Side Guy
 Michael Shannon as Crack Head
 Shulie Cowen as Stoner Girl
 Andrew Rothenberg as Homer
 Tracy Letts as Sports Fan
 Hubert Taczanowski as Immigrant
 Tara Chocol as The Receptionist
 Reggie Hayes as Architect

References

External links

1997 comedy-drama films
1997 films
1997 directorial debut films
Films set in Chicago
American comedy-drama films
Films about taxis
1990s English-language films
1990s American films